Gabriela Dabrowski and Michaëlla Krajicek were the defending champions, but decided not to participate this year.

Alexa Guarachi and Erin Routliffe won the title, defeating Ysaline Bonaventure and Victoria Rodríguez 7–6(7–4), 3–6, [10–4] in the final.

Seeds

Draw

References
Main Draw

Tevlin Women's Challenger
Tevlin Women's Challenger